Science-Fiction Handbook, subtitled The Writing of Imaginative Fiction, is a guide to writing and marketing science fiction and fantasy by L. Sprague de Camp, "one of the earliest books about modern sf." The original edition was published in hardcover by Hermitage House in 1953 as a volume in its Professional Writers Library series. A revised edition, by L. Sprague de Camp and Catherine Crook de Camp, titled Science Fiction Handbook, Revised, was published in hardcover by Owlswick Press in 1975 and as a trade paperback by McGraw-Hill in 1977. An E-book version of the revised edition was published by Gollancz's SF Gateway imprint on April 30, 2014.

Summary
The book comprises a comprehensive guide explaining how to write and market science fiction and fantasy. Peripheral subjects such as lecturing and bookkeeping are also discussed, and a short history of the field of imaginative fiction is included. The revised version excised outdated material, updated the historical section, and added more information on the business and records-keeping end of being a writer.

Contents

Reception
Groff Conklin of Galaxy Science Fiction praised the book, stating that it was "Recommended even for people who don't want to write". Alexei and Cory Panshin praised the original edition as "a marvelous and ungainly book . . . a stewpot of everything De Camp could imagine a writer of SF needing to know." However, reviewing the revised edition, they declared that "A venerable classic has been consistently simplified, softened and trivialized" and concluded that what remained "was not adequate to the problems of writing contemporary SF." Malcolm Edwards and John Clute called it "a useful compendium of information and advice for aspiring writers in its original edition, [though] it gained little from its subsequent revision – indeed, the revised version omitted some material of interest."

Awards
In 2004 the original edition was among the nominees for the 1954 Retro-Hugo Award for Best Related Book.

Notes

1953 non-fiction books
Books by L. Sprague de Camp